Romania sent a delegation to compete at the 2010 Winter Paralympics, in Vancouver, Canada. It fielded a single athlete, in alpine skiing. It did not win a medal.

This was Romania's first ever participation in the Winter Paralympics, although it has been participating in the Summer Games since 1972.

Alpine skiing

The following athlete was Romania's sole representative in alpine skiing:

See also
Romania at the 2010 Winter Olympics
Romania at the Paralympics

References

External links
Vancouver 2010 Paralympic Games official website 
International Paralympic Committee official website

Nations at the 2010 Winter Paralympics
2010
Paralympics